Leah Laiman (born August 29, 1946 in Tel Aviv, Israel) is an American soap opera writer and romance novelist.

Career 
Laiman got her start on daytime television during the early 1980s at General Hospital. Laiman succeeded former Head Writer, Pat Falken Smith, along with novelist Thom Racina. The pair began working on the show during its heyday, including  Luke Spencer and Laura Webber's widely publicized 1981 wedding, which included notable Hollywood legend Elizabeth Taylor. After three years on GH, Laiman followed Racina to Days of Our Lives to work with Sheri Anderson where the three wrote several stories, including Bo and Hope's wedding in England, and co-created the characters of Steve "Patch" Johnson and John Black. In 1986, Laiman became sole head writer and created the character of Jack Deveraux and further developed the popular romance of Steve Johnson and Kayla Brady.

After Days of our Lives, Laiman moved to One Life to Live, where she stayed as staff writer from 1990 through 1997 and served as head writer from 1990 to 1991  and then again from 1996 to 1997. In 1998, she took a job at the ailing NBC Daytime serial Another World. The show was cancelled in June 1999. Her next job was at As the World Turns.  In 2000, Laiman was fired from ATWT and turned to writing novels for five years. Laiman was rehired on As the World Turns in 2005 as an associate head writer.

In 2020 she was one of the recruits for a fiction app named "Radish" which had $63m of funding and it was opening an office in LA. The soap writers recruited included Laiman, Addie Walsh, Lisa Connor and Jean Passanante.

Positions held
Another World
Co-Head Writer (1998–25 June 1999)
The Last AW Writing Team: Leah Laiman (Head Writer, Jean Passanante (co-Head Writer), Stephen Demorest, Melissa Salmons, Laura Maria Censabella, Judy Tate, Tom Wiggin, Tom King, Maura Penders, Richard Culliton, Shelly Altman, Carolyn Culliton, Richard J. Allen, Sofia Landon Geier, Lynn Martin, Gillian Spencer, Mary Sue Price, Edwin Klein, Gordon Rayfield, Courtney Simon, Eleanor Labine

As the World Turns
Associate Head Writer (1997 - 1998; March 3, 2005 - 2005; October 6, 2009 - September 17, 2010)
Co-Head Writer (2005 - January 24, 2008; April 18, 2008 - October 5, 2009)
Head Writer (August 1999 - August 2000)

Days of Our Lives
Associate Head Writer (1991)
Head Writer (1988–1989)
Co-Head Writer (1986–1988)

General Hospital
Writer (1981–1984)

Guiding Light
Associate Head Writer (1993)
Co-Head Writer (1994 – November 1994)

One Life to Live
Co-Head Writer (1996–1998)

Awards and nominations

Daytime Emmy Awards

WINS
(2001; Best Writing; As the World Turns)

NOMINATIONS 
(1983 & 1984; Best Writing; General Hospital)
(1985 & 1987; Best Writing; Days of Our Lives) 
(1990; Best Writing; One Life to Live)
(2000, 2006, 2010 & 2011; Best Writing; As the World Turns)

Writers Guild of America Award

WINS
(2007, 2009 & 2011 seasons; As the World Turns)

NOMINATIONS 
(1988 & 1992 seasons; Days of Our Lives)
(1995 season; Guiding Light) 
(2006, 2008 & 2010 seasons; As the World Turns)

Head writing tenure

References 

1946 births
American soap opera writers
Daytime Emmy Award winners
Jewish American writers
Living people
Women soap opera writers
Writers Guild of America Award winners
21st-century American Jews